Jacqueline Panis (born 16 April 1948) was a member of the Senate of France, representing the Meurthe-et-Moselle department.  She is a member of the Union for a Popular Movement.

References
Page on the Senate website

1948 births
Living people
Union for a Popular Movement politicians
French Senators of the Fifth Republic
Women members of the Senate (France)
21st-century French women politicians
Senators of Meurthe-et-Moselle